Ostroměř is a municipality and village in Jičín District in the Hradec Králové Region of the Czech Republic. It has about 1,400 inhabitants.

Administrative parts
Villages of Domoslavice, Nové Smrkovice and Sylvárův Újezd are administrative parts of Ostroměř.

Notable people
Eduard Štorch (1878–1956), writer and archaeologist
Karel Zeman (1910–1989), film director

References

External links

Villages in Jičín District